A concordancer is a computer program that automatically constructs a   concordance. The output of a concordancer may serve as input to a translation memory system for computer-assisted translation, or as an early step in machine translation.

Concordancers are also used in corpus linguistics to retrieve alphabetically or otherwise sorted lists of linguistic data from the corpus in question, which the corpus linguist then analyzes.

A number of concordancers have been published 
notably 
Oxford Concordance Program (OCP), a concordancer first released in 1981 by Oxford University Computing Services claims to be used in over 200 organisations worldwide.

See also 
 COCOA (digital humanities)
 Cross-reference
 Ctags
 KWIC
 Language industry
 Statistically improbable phrase

References

 Concordancer
Corpus linguistics
Machine translation